Pedro Morales Torres (8 August 1932 – 13 September 2000) was a Chilean former football manager.

He coach several international Chile teams: Chile Olympic team at the 1984 Summer Olympics and the Chile national team at the 1986 FIFA World Cup Qualifications.

Honours

Club
Huachipato
 Primera División de Chile: 1974

Everton
 Primera División de Chile: 1976

Colo-Colo
 Primera División de Chile: 1979

References

External links
 Pedro Morales at MemoriaWanderers.cl 
 Pedro Morales at PartidosdeLaRoja.com 

1932 births
2000 deaths
People from La Serena
Chilean footballers
Deportes La Serena footballers
Chilean football managers
Chilean Primera División managers
Primera B de Chile managers
Colo-Colo managers
Deportes La Serena managers
Ñublense managers
Huachipato managers
Chile national football team managers
Everton de Viña del Mar managers
Club Deportivo Universidad Católica managers
Audax Italiano managers
Santiago Wanderers managers
Universidad de Chile managers
1975 Copa América managers